Per Samuel Frick (born 14 April 1992) is a Swedish profession footballer who plays for IF Elfsborg in Allsvenskan as a striker. He has won two caps for the Sweden national team, scoring one goal.

Career statistics

International 

International goals

Scores and results list Sweden's goal tally first.

Honours 
IF Elfsborg

 Allsvenskan: 2012

References

External links
 
 

1992 births
Living people
Swedish footballers
Sweden international footballers
Sweden youth international footballers
Association football forwards
Allsvenskan players
IF Elfsborg players
Falkenbergs FF players
Sportspeople from Värmland County